The following is a list of awards and nominations received by actress Isabelle Huppert. For her work in cinema, she has won two César Awards, a BAFTA Award, a Golden Globe Award, and been nominated for the Academy Award for Best Actress. She is the most nominated actress for the César Award with 16 nominations. Huppert has twice won the Cannes Film Festival Award for Best Actress, twice won the Volpi Cup for Best Actress at Venice, and is a two-time winner of the European Film Award for Best Actress.

Huppert is the most nominated actress for the Molière Award, with 8 nominations. In 2017, she was awarded the Honorary Molière.

In the same year she was awarded the Europe Theatre Prize.

Huppert was made Chevalier of the Ordre national du Mérite in 1994 and was promoted to Officier in 2005. She was made a Chevalier of the Legion of Honour in 1999 and was promoted to Officer in 2009.

Major associations

Academy Awards

BAFTA Awards

Berlin International Film Festival

Cannes Film Festival

César Awards

European Film Awards

Golden Globe Awards

Independent Spirit Awards

Venice Film Festival

Film festival awards

Art Film Fest

Bogotá International Film Festival

Busan International Film Festival

Cairo International Film Festival

Ebertfest

Festival International du Film Francophone de Namur

Filmfest Ludwigsburg

Flanders International Film Festival Ghent

International Istanbul Film Festival

Karlovy Vary International Film Festival

Lisbon & Estoril Film Festival

Locarno International Film Festival

Manaki Brothers Film Festival

Mar del Plata International Film Festival

Marrakech International Film Festival

Miami International Film Festival

Montreal World Film Festival

Moscow International Film Festival

Mumbai International Film Festival

Munich International Film festival

Odesa International Film Festival

Palm Springs International Film Festival

Philadelphia Film Festival

Pula Film Festival

Rome Film Festival

San Sebastián International Film Festival

Santa Barbara International Film Festival

Seattle International Film Festival

Shanghai International Film Festival

Stockholm International Film Festival

Telluride Film Festival

Valladolid International Film Festival

Critics associations awards

Boston Society of Film Critics

Chicago Film Critics Association

Critics' Choice Movie Awards

Dallas–Fort Worth Film Critics Association

Dublin Film Critics' Circle

Florida Film Critics Circle

Houston Film Critics Society

London Film Critics' Circle

Los Angeles Film Critics Association

National Society of Film Critics

New York Film Critics Circle

New York Film Critics Online

Online Film Critics Society

Russian Guild of Film Critics

San Diego Film Critics Society

San Francisco Film Critics Circle

Seattle Film Critics Society

St. Louis Film Critics Association

Toronto Film Critics Association

Vancouver Film Critics Circle

Other awards and nominations

AACTA International Awards
The Australian Academy of Cinema and Television Arts Awards are presented annually by the Australian Academy of Cinema and Television Arts (AACTA) to recognize and honor achievements in the film and television industry.

AARP Movies for Grownups Awards

Alliance of Women Film Journalists

British Film Institute

Buil Film Awards

Camerimage

David di Donatello Awards

Dorian Awards

Europe Theatre Prize

German Film Awards

Globes de Cristal Awards

Gold Derby Awards

Gotham Awards

Ibsen Centennial Commemoration

Indiewire Critics' Poll

Le Film français

Lumières Awards

Message to Man

Molière Awards

Nastro d'Argento

Prix Suzanne Bianchetti

Sant Jordi Awards

Satellite Awards

UniFrance

Village Voice Film Poll

Titles

Legion of Honour

National Order of Merit

See also
 List of Isabelle Huppert performances

Notes

References

External links
 

Huppert, Isabelle